Hyperplatys pusillus is a species of longhorn beetles of the subfamily Lamiinae. It was described by Henry Walter Bates in 1863, and is known from southwestern Mexico to Panama.

Subspecies
 Hyperplatys pusillus pusillus (Bates, 1863)
 Hyperplatys pusillus nigrisparsus (Bates, 1885)

References

Beetles described in 1863
Acanthocinini